Feedback is a 2020 Russian comedy film directed by Aleksey Nuzhnyy. It was theatrically released in Russia on December 17, 2020.

Plot 
The company of seven friends gathers together again in a house outside the city in order to celebrate the New Year. The holiday will give them a lot of surprises.

Cast

References

External links 
 

2020 films
2020s Russian-language films
2020 comedy films
Russian comedy films